Luo was a minor Chinese feudal state that existed during the Shang Dynasty. Afterwards, when Zhou overthrew Shang, it became one of Zhou states during the Spring and Autumn Period. 

The rulers of Luo shared a common origin with the rulers of Chu. 

Ancient Chinese states
7th-century BC disestablishments
Zhou dynasty
Shang dynasty